Loumidis (Greek: Λουμίδης) is a Greek coffee brand and one of the first coffeehouse companies in Greece.

History
The company has origins in 1920s, in Piraeus, as a coffee retail company by three brothers, Antonis, Nikos and Jason Loumidis. In 1928 the company officially was founded and in 1932 opened a coffee house at the center of Athens and one in Thessaloniki. In 1938 opened also the infamous coffee house on Stadiou Street which soon became a meeting place of intellectuals and artists. The company's motto is translated into English as, “Each one has an expertise and…for Loumidis that is Coffees."

In 1987 Loumidis SA, a company which had the rights of selling the Loumidis Greek coffee brand (with the notable parrot as trademark) was acquired by Nestlé.

See also

 List of coffee companies
 List of coffeehouse chains

References

External links
 

Coffeehouses and cafés in Greece
Coffee brands
Greek brands
1928 establishments in Greece